Bull kelp is a common name for the brown alga Nereocystis luetkeana which is a true kelp in the family Laminariaceae.

Species in the genus Durvillaea are also sometimes called "bull kelp", but this is just a shortening of the common name southern bull kelp.  Durvillaea is a genus in the order Fucales and, though superficially similar in appearance, is not a true kelp (all of which are in the order Laminariales).

Laminariaceae